Siedliszcze is a town in Chełm County, Lublin Voivodeship, in eastern Poland. It is the seat of the gmina (administrative district) called Gmina Siedliszcze.

The town has a population of 813.

History
In 1921, there were 666 Jews living in Siedliszcze, representing 80% of the entire village's population. 
On June 1, 1940, the Nazis created a ghetto in Siedliszcze for the Jewish population. There were about 2,000 Jews from Siedliszcze, Cracow, Lublin and Czechoslovakia in the ghetto. On May 18, 1942 about 630 Jews were sent to the Sobibor extermination camp. The liquidation of the ghetto took place in October 1942 when the rest of the ghetto inmates were sent to the Sobibor extermination camp. During the entire Nazi occupation, shootings of the Jewish population took place at the Jewish cemetery.

References

Cities and towns in Lublin Voivodeship
Chełm County
Ruthenian Voivodeship
Kholm Governorate
Lublin Voivodeship (1919–1939)
Holocaust locations in Poland